Dr.Ratnakar Manikrao Gutte is an Indian politician from Maharashtra and is a member of Maharashtra Legislative Assembly. Ratnakar Gutte born in middle class family in small village of district Beed. Now he represents the Gangakhed Assembly constituency. A string of companies owned by him has been accused of fraud and the Enforcement Directorate (ED) attached his properties worth Rs. 255 crores.

About
MLA Dr. Ratnakar Gutte is on his political journey with the determination of Palam and Poorna talukas should be developed along with Gangakhed. He has always cultivated political and social commitment. MLA Dr. Ratnakar Gutte is known as Mahameru of development.

He is making a successful move for the development of Gangakhed constituency. Success or failure, power or not, MLA Dr. Ratnakar Gutte's work is going on. MLA Dr. Gutte was criticized many times by the opposition who was upset after the opposition was defeated by the pace of his development work, but he was also criticized for being meek in his conduct.

Even today some opposition members says that "MLA Dr.Ratnakar Gutte's work is number one", this shows his working method. MLA Dr. Ratnakar Gutte is still fighting for the transformation of Gangakhed assembly constituency. This constituency knows that even when he was not in power,MLA Dr. Ratnakar Gutte raised the fight for development for the common man.

Ratnakar Gutte owns the Sunil Hitech Engineers Limited, established in May 1998 which is named after his son Sunil Ratnakar Gutte.

References

Maharashtra MLAs 2019–2024
Living people
Rashtriya Samaj Paksha politicians
1958 births